Lucien Roquebert (12 January 1890 – 8 February 1970) was a French racing cyclist. He finished in last place in the 1911 Tour de France.

References

External links
 

1890 births
1970 deaths
French male cyclists
Sportspeople from Landes (department)
Cyclists from Nouvelle-Aquitaine